Wildcat Mountain is a mountain located in the Catskill Mountains of New York east-southeast of Frost Valley. Hemlock Mountain is located northeast, Van Wyck Mountain is located southeast, and Fir Mountain is located north of Wildcat Mountain.

References

Mountains of Ulster County, New York
Mountains of New York (state)